David Appel may refer to:

David Appel (businessman) (born 1950), Israeli businessman
David Appel (ice hockey) (born 1981), Czech ice hockey player